Valdora is a rural locality in the Sunshine Coast Region, Queensland, Australia.

History 
Golden Valley State School opened on 27 August 1918. On 1 July 1940, it was renamed Valdora State School. In 1949, the school building was moved to a new location and re-opened on 1 February 1949 as Yandina Creek State School. It closed on 7 August 1964. Valdora State School was at Valdora Road.

References

Suburbs of the Sunshine Coast Region
Localities in Queensland